Ian Mackendrick Hendry (13 January 1931 – 24 December 1984) was a British actor. He worked on several British TV series of the 1960s and 1970s, including the lead in the first series of The Avengers and The Lotus Eaters, and played roles in the films The Hill (1965), Repulsion (1965), Get Carter (1971), and Theatre of Blood (1973).

Early years
Hendry was born in Ipswich, Suffolk, on 13 January 1931. His mother, Enid (née Rushton), was born in Durham in 1906. His father, James Hendry, was born in 1901 in Glasgow where he graduated with a degree in chemistry from the University of Glasgow before moving to Ipswich in 1924 to take up a graduate position with R & W Paul Ltd.  His grandfather, George Rushton, was an artist and Head of the Ipswich Art School (1906 – 1929). 
 
Hendry's younger brother, Donald, was born on 15 August 1933. They were both educated at the Ipswich School and Culford School, Suffolk. At Culford School, Hendry took an interest in sport, particularly boxing, cricket, running and rugby. He was also involved in amateur dramatics at Culford, helping to produce and perform in several school plays.

Career

1947–1953: career choices and national service
On leaving school in 1947, aged 16, Hendry studied at the College of Estate Management in London. In 1948, he spent a year working for Bidwells at their Cambridge office. In 1949, he began his National Service as part of the programme of conscription in the United Kingdom introduced after World War. He spent two years with the 32nd Medium Regiment, Royal Artillery, during which time he paced for Christopher Chataway in athletics and ran a motorcycle stunt team. On completing his national service he returned to work in estate management at Bidwells London office in Edgware.  During this period, Hendry re-established his interest in acting, becoming involved in amateur theatre through a local amateur dramatics group in Edgware.

1953–1955: Central School of Speech and Drama
By 1953, Hendry decide to change his career and follow his ambition to become an actor. In late 1952, he applied to and was accepted for the Central School of Speech and Drama, London. He trained there from 1953 to 1955. His contemporaries at the school included Judi Dench and Vanessa Redgrave, both two years below him; Wanda Ventham, his future co-star in the series The Lotus Eaters, who was in the year below; and Jeremy Brett and Wendy Craig, who were in the year above him.

1955–1959: theatre, television and film work
Hendry's professional acting career began in 1955, working in repertory at the Hornchurch Theatre in Station Lane. He was appeared in Goldoni's Servant of Two Masters at the Edinburgh Festival. In 1957, Hendry spent another season in repertory, performing in several plays at the Oxford Playhouse, Oxford. In December 1957, Dinner with the Family transferred to the West End, playing at the New Theatre, London.

As his career developed, he gained parts in films including Up in the World (1956), The Secret Place (1957) and Room at the Top (1959).

1960–1969: theatre, television and film work
In 1960, Hendry had a part in Sink the Bismarck! (1960). He then played the lead role of Dr Geoffrey Brent in the 12 episode crime series Police Surgeon. Hendry was next cast in the similar role of Dr David Keel in the action-adventure series The Avengers. Initially, Hendry was the star of this series, which co-starred Patrick Macnee as John Steed. However, production of the first season was curtailed by a strike and Hendry used the opportunity to depart the series and begin a film career - The Avengers continued with Macnee as its lead.

Hendry had lead roles in several films; Live Now, Pay Later (1962), Girl in the Headlines (1963), The Hill (1965) opposite Sean Connery, and Roman Polanski's Repulsion (1965). He starred in Gerry Anderson's film, Doppelgänger (1969), also known as Journey to the Far Side of the Sun. During the 1960s he appeared in TV series such as Armchair Theatre, Danger Man, The Saint and The Gold Robbers. He played the lead role as disbarred Queen's Counsel Alex Lambert in the TV series The Informer (1966–67).

1970–1979: theatre, television and film work
In the early 1970s, Hendry had lead roles in several TV series including The Adventures of Don Quick (1970) and The Lotus Eaters (1972–73). He guest starred, alongside Brian Blessed, in the first episode of The Sweeney, titled "Ringer", made in 1974 and broadcast early in 1975. He appeared regularly as a guest star in TV series including The Persuaders!, Dial M For Murder, Churchill's People, Thriller, Van Der Valk, Supernatural, Crown Court, The Enigma Files, Bergerac and The Chinese Detective. Hendry was reunited with Patrick Macnee as a guest star on The New Avengers, although he did not reprise the role of David Keel. His previous role in the series was acknowledged, however, by Steed's parting words: "It may be seventeen years late, but welcome back Gunner." (season 1, ep. 7 "To catch a rat").

Towards the end of the decade Hendry appeared as a former SAS Trooper and convict Roy Gates in the Return of the Saint episode "Yesterday's Hero."

He appeared in a number of films, including the Hammer entry Captain Kronos – Vampire Hunter (1974). Among the more widely seen films he appeared in during this time were Get Carter (1971), for which he received a BAFTA nomination for Best Supporting Actor, Theatre of Blood (1973) opposite Vincent Price, The Passenger (1975) and Damien: Omen II (1978).

1980–1984: television and film work

Hendry starred opposite Nyree Dawn Porter in the TV series For Maddie with Love (1980). In 1980 Hendry appeared in the film McVicar based on the life of the bank robber John McVicar (played by Roger Daltrey of rock band The Who). Towards the end of his life he had a role in the crime series Jemima Shore Investigates as the eponymous heroine's literary agent. His final TV role was in the Channel Four soap opera Brookside (1984).

Personal life

Hendry's first marriage was to Phyllis Joanna Bell, née Chaddock, in September 1955. Phyllis preferred to be known as 'Jo' - an abbreviation of her middle-name - and worked as a make-up artist for Leichner. The marriage ended in 1962. Hendry married actress Janet Munro on 16 February 1963. They had two daughters, Sally and Corrie, but their turbulent life together ended in divorce in 1971. Munro died a year later in London from the heart condition myocarditis. This was a contributory factor in Hendry's increasing dependence on alcohol. Hendry later married Sandra (Sandy) Jones on 27 May 1975, with whom he had a daughter, Emma.

Later years
Hendry was declared bankrupt in the late 1970s. He suffered from several health problems in his latter years, largely due to his long-term problems with alcohol which affected his professional and personal life.

His last part in a film was a substantial, though uncredited, role as a corrupt policeman in McVicar (1980). His last public appearance was as a guest on an October 1984 episode of This Is Your Life which profiled his former Avengers co-star Patrick Macnee, who had been a special guest when This Is Your Life featured Hendry in March 1978.

Death
On 24 December 1984, Hendry died of a gastrointestinal hemorrhage in London, aged 53. He was cremated, and his ashes interred in the Lily Pond beds at the Golders Green Crematorium.

Filmography

1955–1959

1960–1969

1970–1979

1980–1984

Television

1955–1959

1960–1969

1970–1979

1980–84

Theatre

1950–59

1960–1969

1970–1979

Radio work

Awards and nominations

Film 

|-
| style="text-align:center;"| 1962
|Live Now Pay Later
|BAFTA Award for Most Promising Newcomer to Leading Film Roles
|
|-
| style="text-align:center;"| 1971
|Get Carter
|BAFTA Film Award for Best Supporting Actor
|

|}

Television

|-
| style="text-align:center;"| 1966
|The Informer
|Rediffusion Golden Star Award for Best Actor
|
|}

References

Further reading - Ian Hendry Biography
Hershman, Gabriel. Send in the Clowns – The Yo Yo Life of Ian Hendry, Lulu.com, 2013;

External links
 Official tribute 

1931 births
1984 deaths
20th-century English male actors
Male actors from London
Actors from Ipswich
Alumni of the Royal Central School of Speech and Drama
Deaths from gastrointestinal hemorrhage
English male film actors
English male radio actors
English male stage actors
English male television actors
People educated at Culford School
People educated at Ipswich School
Golders Green Crematorium
British people of English descent
English people of Scottish descent